Áine Lyng (born 1988) is a camogie player and sport science student. She won a Soaring Star award in 2009 and played in the 2009 All Ireland junior camogie final. Áine has been nominated for a senior All Star four times and has won Gael Linn medals with Munster in both Junior (as captain) and Senior. Won an All-Ireland medal with Mercy College and three and a Colleges All Stars while playing for U.L. She holds National League, Under-16 All-Ireland, Munster Junior and Intermediate medals with Waterford. At club level she captured county medals in Under-14, Under-16, Under-18 and Senior (two), as well as an All-Ireland sevens title from 2007.

References

External links 
 Official Camogie Website
 Waterford GAA website
 of 2009 championship in On The Ball Official Camogie Magazine
 Video Highlights of 2009 All Ireland Junior Final
 Report of Offaly v Waterford 2009 All Ireland junior final in Irish Times Independent, Examiner and Offaly Express.
 Video highlights of 2009 championship Part One and part two

1988 births
Living people
Waterford camogie players
UL GAA camogie players